Prokop František Šedivý (July 4, 1764 – c. 1810) was a significant Czech playwright, actor, and translator of the National Revival era. He is considered to be one of the founders of modern Czech theater and he was involved in founding the first entirely Czech-language theater Bouda.

Biography 
Generally, there is not much information about Šedivý's life. He was born in Prague, into a brewer's family, and probably worked as a state official later.

Works 
Šedivý's best-known plays are Kníže Honzík (Prince Honzík, the very first Czech play), Pražští sládci (The Prague Brewers), and České Amazonky (The Czech Amazons, 1792).

He translated Shakespeare's King Lear into Czech.

See also 
 List of Czech writers

References 
 Czech Literature, 1774 to 1918

1764 births
1810 deaths
19th-century Czech dramatists and playwrights
Czech male dramatists and playwrights
Czech translators
19th-century translators
18th-century translators